Copelatus kalaharii is a species of diving beetle. It is part of the genus Copelatus in the subfamily Copelatinae of the family Dytiscidae. It was described by Gschwendtner in 1935.

References

kalaharii
Beetles described in 1935